Road routes in Victoria assist drivers navigating roads throughout the state, as roads may change names several times between destinations, or have a second local name in addition to a primary name. Victoria currently uses two route numbering schemes: the older, numerical shield-based system (which this article focuses on); and a newer, alphanumeric system, slowly replacing the older system.

Victoria implemented the federally-issued National Routes system between 1954 and 1955, using white-and-black shields highlighting interstate links between major regional centres; some of these routes were later upgraded into National Highways using green-and-gold shields when the National Roads Act was passed in 1974.

The original route numbering scheme, now known as the Metropolitan Route Numbering Scheme, allocated blue-and-white shields across Melbourne as metropolitan routes, numbered to fit around existing National Routes; this system received a major refurbishment in the late 1980s, with the creation of Tourist Routes as a result. Freeway Routes were spun off from this system between 1970 and 1987, and it was extended into a system covering rural Victoria as the State Route Numbering Scheme in 1985.

The Statewide Route Numbering Scheme, introduced in late 1996, has effectively replaced the previous scheme across regional Victoria, and is progressively replacing routes across Melbourne. It consists of alphanumeric routes, a one-to-three digit number prefixed with a letter (M, A, B, or C) that denotes the grade and importance of the road, and is now the state's default road route numbering system.

Some routes, in part or in their entirety, may have been made obsolete by the alphanumeric designation: these replacement routes are noted but not listed in full here. Some also may follow older alignments or routes later changed even after the new system was introduced, and are included here for the sake of completion. Roads are described in either a west–east or north–south alignment.

For a list of major highways and freeways in Melbourne, see List of highways in Melbourne and List of freeways in Victoria.

National Routes

National Routes were the first type of route numbering to be attempted in Australia on a large scale, signed with a white shield and black writing (similar in shape to the shield that appears on the Australian coat of arms), with Victoria receiving routes in 1954. They highlighted the interstate links connecting major population, industrial and principal regions of Victoria to the rest of the Australia, in a way that was readily identifiable to interstate travellers. The system was prepared by COSRA (Conference of State Road Authorities), held between 1953 and 1954: once each state road authority agreed to the scheme, it was rolled out federally.

In 1954, the Hume Highway was trialled as National Route 31, chosen due to its prominence as a transport corridor connecting Australia's largest cities (Melbourne and Sydney). Soon after, other National Routes across the state were allocated. Selected routes were later upgraded into National Highways when the National Roads Act was passed in 1974.

Victoria's National Routes were eventually replaced with the Statewide Route Numbering Scheme, introduced in stages across the state beginning in late 1996: each route was converted to an alphanumeric route number, rendering the black-and-white shield redundant. Most National Routes in rural Victoria kept their number during the conversion; an exception was National Route 16, which became B400. Most routes were replaced in 1997 - unless otherwise stated in the table below - with the last of Victoria's routes, National Route 79, finally eliminated in 2013 (although a vestige of Alternative National Route 1 still exists through southeastern Melbourne).

National Highways

With the passing of the National Roads Act in 1974, selected National Routes were further upgraded to the status of a National Highway: interstate roads linking Australia's capital cities and major regional centres that received federal funding, and were of higher importance than other National Routes. These new routes were symbolised by green shields with gold writing, and the word "National" along the top of the shield. Victoria's first two National Highways, the Western and Hume Highways, were declared in 1974 and their shields converted in the following years; the Sturt and Goulburn Valley Highways were declared later in 1992.

Like National Routes, Victoria's National Highways were also replaced with the Statewide Route Numbering Scheme, introduced across the state beginning in late 1996: each route was converted to an alphanumeric route number, all keeping their number during the conversion, but also initially keeping the National green-and-gold shield design; this was eventually eliminated in 2014. While most routes were replaced in 1997, the tail-ends of some routes terminating in suburban Melbourne were kept for some years afterwards, until bypassed or reallocated with the opening of a related road project: these are stated in the table below. The last of Victoria's National Highways, the tail-end of National Highway 8, was finally eliminated in 2009.

Metropolitan and State Routes

Melbourne
Early in 1964, planning by the Traffic Commission (and consulting with 43 municipal councils and the Country Roads Board), the Metropolitan Route Numbering Scheme - a new route numbering system for the Greater Melbourne area - was unveiled in 1965; Victoria was the first mainland state to adopt this system. The Metropolitan ("Metro") route numbering scheme was symbolised by blue rounded shields with white writing: east–west routes were to be even-numbered, while north–south routes were to be odd-numbered; the numbers allotted to routes were to be complementary to the existing National Routes system; a year later, most of the urban municipalities were either cooperating in the project or had agreed to do so, with 18 having completed or substantially completed the erection of route markers. The scheme had a significant refurbishment during the late 1980s: between 1987 and 1990, many existing routes through Melbourne were modified and new routes were introduced (noted in the table below) to cover new growth areas of Melbourne, involving consultation with over 54 metropolitan municipalities as well as road user groups. A total of 76,000 signs were installed at 1,060 intersections and other locations at a cost of $530,000, with the last signs installed in April 1990.

The most recent change to the system was the introduction of the Statewide Route Numbering System into regional Victoria, beginning in late 1996. While many routes on the outer urban fringes of Melbourne were incorporated into the new alphanumeric system (some only introduced less than 10 years earlier), the majority of the system across suburban Melbourne still survives to the current day. While some metropolitan routes are still being allocated (like  in 2016), the expectation is their eventual replacement in the near-future by the new alphanumeric system, with a small number of routes currently undergoing conversion.

Rural Victoria
After the success of the Metropolitan Route Numbering Scheme across the Greater Melbourne area, an extension of the system was rolled out across regional Victoria from late 1985 as the State Route Numbering System; the South Gippsland Highway was the first road in Victoria signed with a State Route, with others following through 1986 and 1987, at an estimated cost of $400,000. The designated routes were considered major significant intra-state and regional links that weren't already National Routes. The allocation of State Routes occurred with lower numbers in western Victoria gradually increasing in a clockwise direction to eastern Victoria. Like their suburban Melbourne counterparts, east–west routes were to be even-numbered, while north–south routes were to be odd-numbered, with reservations between 91-99 for the Greater Geelong area, and 100-199 for all of rural Victoria.

The system lasted just over a decade, before the Statewide Route Numbering Scheme was first introduced in north–eastern Victoria in late 1996. Most State Routes were converted into the alphanumeric system by 1998, with the rest completed by 2000; none now exist.

Freeway Routes 

After the success of the Metropolitan Route Numbering Scheme across the Greater Melbourne area, a new route number system specifically for suburban freeways was rolled out in 1970, following the opening of the first section of the Tullamarine Freeway. Freeway Routes were symbolised by green rounded shields with white writing, with route numbers prefixed by the letter F. They were the first type of route numbering in Victoria based solely on road classification alone, providing a clear separation to other route numbering systems across Melbourne. Route numbers were adapted from the Metropolitan Route Numbering System, with numbers 80 to 90 exclusively reserved for Freeway Routes.

The system was decommissioned between 1987 and 1990: routes were either replaced by a metropolitan route or a National Route number, or simply removed if allocations already existed concurrent to the Freeway Route. Some of these route numbers have been subsequently reallocated as metropolitan routes across Melbourne (like  and ).

Ring Road Routes

Tourist Routes

As part of the major refurbishment of the Metropolitan Route Numbering Scheme in the late 1980s, one of Melbourne's more-scenic metropolitan routes was converted into the state's first Tourist Route in 1989, a route specifically marked as being suited for visiting tourists or linking to particular tourist attractions. Tourist Routes are symbolised by a five-sided shield and coloured brown to stand out from existing routes, and were untouched by the introduction of the Statewide Route Numbering System in late 1996.

See also

References

 
Road routes
Victoria
Road routes